Hardo Rattali also spell as Hardo Ratali, is a town and Union Council in Nowshera Virkan Tehsil, Gujranwala District, Punjab, Pakistan.

See also

 Gujranwala
 Wazirabad
 Kamoke
 Nowshera Virkan

References

Cities and towns in Gujranwala District
Populated places in Nowshera Virkan Tehsil
Union councils of Nowshera Virkan Tehsil